NUSSLI Group (correct spelling Nüssli) is an internationally operating group that is specialized in event, stadia and exhibition construction.

Nussli plans, constructs, rents and sells temporary and permanent constructions like stadiums, grandstands, bleachers, platforms, stages, pedestrian bridges along with exhibition stands, pavilions and halls for sport and cultural events
, exhibitions and trade fairs. These also include infrastructure projects – overlay works and overlay planning – for major events.

The company is headquartered in Switzerland with branches in Germany, Austria, Spain, Italy, the United States, Czech Republic, Abu Dhabi and Qatar. The company is represented throughout partners in further countries. The Nussli Group employs a permanent workforce with a total of around 350 employees, whereby the personnel capacity is sometimes even doubled for major projects.

Company history
The company was founded in 1941 by Heini Nüssli (1919–2011) as a carpentry workshop in Hüttwilen, Switzerland. In 1958 the company entered into the scaffolding sector and in the following year they began with the rental and assembly of grandstands, stages made of wood and steel tubing. As a result, NUSSLI developed new scaffolding, stage, and grandstand systems, made several acquisitions starting in the 1980s, and established branches abroad as of the late 1980s. Their international expansion grew even stronger particularly as of the year 2000. In 2007, the company established the scaffolding sector independently under the name xBau, and since that time has turned its focus towards the event, stadia and exhibition markets.

Products
The key products of NUSSLI are:

Events:
Grandstand and bleachers construction
Stadium construction (Temporary Stadium, Modular stadium)
Staging
Temporary building infrastructures (e.g. bridges, fencing, podiums and platforms)
SAFER Barrier / Catch Fence

Exhibitions: 
Exhibition stand construction
Pavilion construction
Halls construction

Services offered by Nussli are: 
Planning and consulting
Rent and sale
Project management
General contracting

Notes and references

External links

Construction and civil engineering companies established in 1941
Consulting firms established in 1941
Swiss companies established in 1941